Ravenea glauca is a species of flowering plant in the family Arecaceae. It is found only in Madagascar. It is threatened by habitat loss.

References

External links
 Palmpedia.net

glauca
Endemic flora of Madagascar
Vulnerable flora of Africa
Taxonomy articles created by Polbot
Taxa named by Joseph Marie Henry Alfred Perrier de la Bâthie
Taxa named by Henri Lucien Jumelle